John Palm (13 June 1885 – 24 February 1925) was a Curaçao-born composer.

Biography
Johan Antoine Palm—better known as John Palm—was a grandson of Jan Gerard Palm (1831-1906), who is often referred to as the "father of Curaçao classical music". Like his cousin Jacobo Palm and his brother Rudolph Palm, John started at music lessons from his grandfather at a young age.

Palm played several musical instruments such as piano, clarinet and flute. He joined some orchestras such as "Los Dispuestos" and a sextet "Los seis". With his favorite instrument the clarinet, John Palm gave many clarinet solos. Like Frederique Chopin, John died at the relatively young age of 39 due to tuberculosis, in Curaçao.

Compositions
As a composer Palm wrote waltzes including "La Belleza", "Club X", "Emma", "La Veloce"" "Ma Pensee", "Gozar sufriendo" and "Nocturno."

References

http://books.caribseek.com/Curacao/Muziek_en_Musici_Nederlandse Antillen

http://books.caribseek.com/Curacao/Honderd_Jaar_Muziekleven_op_Curacao.

1885 births
1925 deaths
20th-century composers
Curaçao musicians
Dutch Antillean composers
Male composers
20th-century Dutch male musicians